Torvikbukt is a village in Gjemnes Municipality in Møre og Romsdal county, Norway.

Economy

Industry
The biggest and most important company is Gjøco A/S. Gjøco is a paint producer, and has the second largest market share in the Norway for indoor-painting products.

Agriculture is also an important industry for the area. Torvikbukt has several small- and medium-sized farms, which makes a big impact at the villages surroundings and way of living. More recently, many farms have been abandoned, mainly because of the lack of relatives that will continue the production after their retirement of the farmer. Agriculture at Western Norway can be very inefficient because of the alpine landscape, and it makes the business not very profitable.

Tourism
Torvikbukt's typical Norwegian surroundings of fjords and mountains makes it an excellent starting point for mountain hiking, fishing, and boat-safari. This attracts both domestic and foreign tourists, which have resulted in the village having many "leisure houses". These houses are normally placed close to the fjord. Reinsfjellet is a mountain with a very good view and is frequently hiked by tourists.

Education
Torvikbukt has its own elementary school which includes students in first through seventh grades. This is a private school called Torvikbukt Skule. The school has approximately 30 pupils. The school was founded in 2009 as an alternative, after the public school Torvik Skole (government founded) was closed down because of a lack of funds in the budget of the Gjemnes municipality. The pupils can alternatively learn at Batnfjord Skule which is the closest public school.

Nordvestlandet folk high school, one of Norway´s 83 folk high schools, was established in Torvikbukt in 1917, and it is still operating there.

References

External links
  Torvikbukt 

Villages in Møre og Romsdal
Gjemnes